Daisy-Villa is a neighborhood in Pasadena, California. It is bordered by Sierra Madre Boulevard to the west, Orange Grove Boulevard to the north, the 210 Freeway to the south, and the Eaton Wash to the east. Daisy-Villa is an exclusively residential neighborhood with approximately 350 homes. The neighborhood is named after two streets that meet in the center of the community.

Landmarks
Gwinn Park is in the northeast corner of the neighborhood, and the neighborhood has access to more parks than any other in Pasadena. Residents can easily walk to nearby Victory Park, as well as the adjacent Sunnyslope Park and Vina Vieja Park, home to Pasadena's popular Alice's Dog Park.

Education
Daisy-Villa is served by Don Benito Elementary School, Norma Coombs Elementary School, Field Elementary School, Wilson Middle School, and Pasadena High School.

Transportation
It is served by Metro Local line 256; Pasadena Transit routes 31, 40, and 60; and Foothill Transit Route 187.

Neighborhoods in Pasadena, California